North Mesquite High School is a secondary school in Mesquite, Texas and a part of the Mesquite Independent School District (MISD). As of 2023, the school serves northern portions of Mesquite and the MISD portion of Garland. Formerly, North Mesquite served all of Sunnyvale, before the completion of Sunnyvale High School, leaving the class of 2010 the last North Mesquite class catering to Sunnyvale students.

North Mesquite serves grades 9 through 12. The total enrollment in 2002 was 2450; the school is therefore under the UIL AAAAAA (or 6A) division. According to the MISD Report Card, the per student expenditure for the same 2002 period was 2700 USD. The stallion is the school mascot and the school colors are blue and white.  The school's motto is Animus Omnia Vincit, which translates from the Latin as "Courage Conquers All."

History
North Mesquite High School opened in September 1969 as the second high school in Mesquite ISD, behind Mesquite High School, the school's rival in athletic competitions. The original construction consisted of four floors: A, B, C, and D.  Over several decades, the enrollment expanded in accordance with the population swell that took place in Mesquite and Sunnyvale, demanding supplementary facilities. In the 1990s, a new gym was constructed. F wing and E section opened for the 2002-2003 school year providing twenty new general classrooms as well as a new Band, Orchestra, and Choir hall. During the 2008-2009 school year construction on S wing (Science wing) began, and opened for the 2009-2010 school year providing 8 Labs and 16 science classrooms. With the science wing being added, the existing rooms on A floor were renovated and added new classrooms. The front of the school was renovated; a new entrance was created, and the business office was enlarged and renovated. The cafeteria was enlarged and snack lines were added. In September 2018 a statue of the school’s mascot, a Stallion, was placed inside the building right at the entrance.

Areas served by North Mesquite
North Mesquite serves northern portions of the city of Mesquite and the students in the MISD portion of southern Garland.

Formerly, the school also served all high school students living in Sunnyvale. However, in an election on May 12, 2007, Sunnyvale residents passed a bond creating Sunnyvale High School. From the 2007-2008 school year, ninth grade students in Sunnyvale were housed in Sunnyvale Middle School for two years, until the construction of the high school was complete. Beginning in the 2009-2010 school year, students attended classes at the actual SHS campus. One grade was added consecutively to the high school, making the class of 2010 the last North Mesquite class that catered to Sunnyvale students. Thomas Korosec of D Magazine implied that changing racial demographics at North Mesquite may have motivated the Sunnyvale district to build its own high school.

Demographics
By the 2010s, most of the students were Hispanic/Latino and African-American with 11% being other.

Standardized dress code
All students in North Mesquite are required to dress according to a standardized dress code (similar to a school uniform) as of 2005; the code is used in all Mesquite ISD middle schools, high schools and 5th and 6th grades.

Feeder patterns
Mesquite ISD elementary schools that feed into North Mesquite include all of Florence, Lawrence, McKenzie, Motley, Range, Rugel, Shands, and Tosch. Price Elementary used to be a part of the feeder pattern for NMHS, but that was changed in 2017 for student benefit.

Part of McDonald Middle School and all of Vanston Middle School in Mesquite ISD feed into North Mesquite. (The other alumni of McDonald feed into West Mesquite High School.)

Rivalry
North Mesquite's rival is Mesquite High School. The rivalry dates back to when North Mesquite was founded in 1969. The school was the first to split from Mesquite High, which was then the only high school in the city, and thus the rivalry started.

2012
The North Mesquite Band, known as the Big Blue Band (BBB for short), was started with the opening of the school in 1969. In recent years Big Blue has relatively gotten attention in East Texas as one of the better bands. Big Blue had its best year in 2012 with its show entitled "Immortal". Under the direction of Jeffery D Jones, Big Blue started the season big as they wowed the crowd at The Mesquite Marching Competition. At their next competition, The Classic on the Lake hosted in Little Elm Texas, Big Blue earned its bragging rights. Ending in 3rd in Prelims, the band went to finish in 2nd place in finals placing behind Sherman High. At the UIL Big Blue got straight ones, advancing them to the Area C Marching Competition. At their final Performance North ended their season there with a heart breaking loss. Of the twenty so schools there, North ended in 5th, one spot below the four bands that would continue to state. Losing to Rowlett, Duncanville, Coppell, and Berkner High, North waited for 2014, hoping to be one of those 4 bands, heading to their first State Marching Competition.

Notable alumni

Dave Abbruzzese Drummer for Pearl Jam from 1991 to 1994 
Joe Bowden, Oklahoma linebacker, later played for Dallas Cowboys
Tarell Brown, University of Texas defensive back, drafted by the San Francisco 49ers in the 2007 NFL Draft in Round 5 (147 overall).
Bryan Hickman, Kansas State linebacker
Josh Buhl, Kansas State linebacker
Todd Graham, former Hawaii head football coach.
Jerry Hall, model and ex-wife of Mick Jagger
Amy Hooks, current Lamar University head softball coach; received several awards as a Texas Longhorns softball player.
Frank Kassela, Professional Poker Player, World Series of Poker Player of the Year 2010. Youngest Drill Sergeant to serve in the U.S. Army.
Paul Martin Lester, Clinical Professor for the School of Arts, Technology, and Emerging Communication, the University of Texas at Dallas, Richardson, Texas (1971 Graduate)
Dezmin Lewis, NFL player
J'Marcus Webb, offensive tackle with the Seattle Seahawks

External links

 North Mesquite HS — official web site

References

 https://twitter.com/NorthMesquiteHS

Educational institutions established in 1969
Mesquite Independent School District high schools
Mesquite, Texas
1969 establishments in Texas